Beware of Blondes is a 1928 American Silent drama film directed by George B. Seitz. With no copies listed in any film archives, Beware of Blondes is now lost with a trailer surviving in the Library of Congress collection.

Cast
 Dorothy Revier as Mary
 Matt Moore as Jeffrey
 Roy D'Arcy as Harry
 Robert Edeson as Costigan
 Walter P. Lewis as Tex
 Hazel Howell as Blonde Mary
 Harry Semels as Portugee Joe

References

External links

1928 films
1928 drama films
Silent American drama films
American silent feature films
American black-and-white films
Columbia Pictures films
Films directed by George B. Seitz
Lost American films
1928 lost films
Lost drama films
1920s American films
1920s English-language films